Välimäki is a Finnish surname. Notable people with the surname include:

Hans Välimäki (born 1970), Finnish chef
Jussi Välimäki (born 1974), Finnish rally driver
Linda Välimäki (born 1990), Finnish ice hockey player
Juuso Välimäki (born 1998), Calgary Flames defenseman
Pasi Välimäki (born 1965), Finnish Army officer
Sami Välimäki (born 1974), Professional golfer

Finnish-language surnames